Cherokee National Treasure is a distinction created in 1988 by the Cherokee Nation to recognize people who have made significant contributions to the preservation of the tribe's art, language, and culture.

The tribe published a biographical overview of these cultural bearers, Cherokee National Treasures: In Their Own Words, co-edited by Shawna Morton-Cain and Pamela Jumper-Thurman in 2017.

List of recipients

Notes

References

Further reading
The Lost Arts Project - 1988
Cherokee national treasures list - Anadisgoi

Cherokee Nation
American awards
Awards established in 1988
Awards for contributions to society
Awards honoring indigenous people
Honorary titles of the United States
1988 establishments in the United States